SGR 1806−20 is a magnetar, a type of neutron star with a very powerful magnetic field, that was discovered in 1979 and identified as a soft gamma repeater. SGR 1806−20 is located about 13 kiloparsecs (42,000 light-years) from Earth on the far side of the Milky Way in the constellation of Sagittarius. , SGR 1806-20 is the most highly magnetized object ever observed, with a magnetic field over 1015 gauss (G) (1011 tesla) in intensity (compared to the Sun's 1–5 G and Earth's 0.25–0.65 G).

Explosion

 Fifty thousand years after a starquake occurred on the surface of SGR 1806-20, the radiation from the resultant explosion reached Earth on December 27, 2004 (GRB 041227). In terms of gamma rays, the burst had an absolute magnitude around −29. It was the brightest event known to have been sighted on this planet from an origin outside the Solar System, until the GRB 080319B. The magnetar released more energy in one-tenth of a second (1.0 J) than the Sun releases in 150,000 years (4 W × 4.8 s = 1.85 J). Such a burst is thought to be the largest explosion observed in this galaxy by humans since the SN 1604 supernova observed by Johannes Kepler in 1604. The gamma rays struck Earth's ionosphere and created more ionization, which briefly expanded the ionosphere.

The nearest known magnetar to Earth is 1E 1048.1-5937, located 9,000 light-years away in the constellation Carina.

Location
SGR 1806−20 lies at the core of radio nebula G10.0-0.3 and is a member of an open cluster named after it, itself a component of  W31, one of the largest H II regions in the Milky Way. Cluster 1806-20 is made up of some highly unusual stars, including at least two carbon-rich Wolf–Rayet stars (WC9d and WCL), two blue hypergiants, and LBV 1806-20, one of the brightest/most massive stars in the galaxy.

See also
 LBV 1806-20 – luminous blue variable

Notes

References

External links

Anniversary of a Cosmic Blast (Phil Plait Dec. 27, 2012)
An exceptionally bright flare from SGR 1806-20 and the origins of short-duration big gamma-ray bursts, 2005-04-28 (Nature)
Huge 'star-quake' rocks Milky Way, 2005-02-18, (BBC News Online)
Brightest galactic flash ever detected hits Earth 2005-02-18 (space.com)
 2005-02-20 (The Age) Registration required.
Huge quake cracks star 2005-09-27 (space.com)
 NASA Sees Hidden Structure Of Neutron Star In Starquake (SpaceDaily) April 26, 2006

Soft gamma repeaters
Sagittarius (constellation)
Astronomical objects discovered in 1979
Magnetars